Dick Tracy vs. Cueball is a 1946 American action film based on the 1930s comic strip character of the same name created by Chester Gould. The film stars Morgan Conway as Dick Tracy in the second installment of the Dick Tracy film series released by RKO Radio Pictures. The villain, Cueball, is a murderous diamond thief who gets his monicker for his big, round head.

Plot
Aboard an ocean liner that has just docked is Lester Abbott, carrying diamonds he intends to sell to gem dealer Jules Sparkle. Before he can leave the ship, he is robbed and strangled by ex-con Cueball, who was alerted to Abbott's arrival by two accomplices, Simon Little and Mona Clyde, who work for Sparkle. Little and Clyde have arranged with crooked antique dealer Percival Priceless to pay Cueball a few thousand dollars and then resell the stolen gems for a fortune, splitting the proceeds three ways.

After meeting with Little—who did not expect Cueball to murder Abbott and tries to back out of the deal—Cueball visits Filthy Flora, madam of the Dripping Dagger Bar. She lets him stay there in a hidden room where he will be safe from police, but she knows he has the diamonds and demands a large payment.

Detectives Dick Tracy and Pat Patton visit Sparkle's establishment to question him. The detectives become suspicious of Little and Clyde. Tracy surreptitiously follows Clyde that evening, and sees her slip a note under the door of Priceless's shop and walk away. After the note disappears under the door, Tracy gains entry and questions Priceless, who claims that Clyde is a customer seeking candlesticks. Unsatisfied, Tracy enlists his friend, the aged thespian Vitamin Flintheart, to visit the shop the next day and observe any suspicious activity. Posing as a customer, Flintheart sees Clyde enter and leave, but is unable to overhear her conversation with Priceless, who learns from her that Little (whose intended role in the scheme was to recut the gems) is an unreliable partner.

Priceless goes to Cueball's room to complete the transaction for the diamonds, not realizing that Tracy and Patton are tailing him. Cueball sees the detectives in the bar and becomes enraged. Suspecting Priceless of treachery, he strangles him. Later, while Cueball is temporarily away, Flora searches his room for the diamonds. She finds and steals them, but Cueball has been watching her through a window. He confronts and strangles her.

Cueball's habit of strangling his victims with a braided leather hatband provides the police with a clue to his identity. Hoping to lure him out of hiding, Tracy allows his girlfriend Tess Trueheart to meet with Little and Clyde on the pretense of being a wealthy customer seeking diamonds. Before she can meet them she is kidnapped by Cueball, who discovers her identity and is about to strangle her when Tracy arrives on the scene. During the chase that ensues, Cueball runs onto a railroad track, where he gets his foot stuck under the track and is killed by a speeding locomotive.

Cast
 Morgan Conway as Dick Tracy 
 Anne Jeffreys as Tess Trueheart
 Lyle Latell as Pat Patton
 Rita Corday as Mona Clyde
 Ian Keith as Vitamin Flintheart 
 Dick Wessel as Harry "Cueball" Lake
 Douglas Walton as Percival Priceless
 Esther Howard as Filthy Flora
 Joseph Crehan as Chief Brandon
 Byron Foulger as Simon Little
 Jimmy Crane as Junior, Tracy's adopted son 
 Milton Parsons as Higby, assistant to Priceless
 Skelton Knaggs as Rudolph, accomplice diamond cutter
 Ralph Dunn as Policeman (uncredited)

Reception
Upon its release, Variety called the film "Hot action celluloid that's bang-up and bang-bang from start to finish."
In 1978, Dick Tracy vs. Cueball was listed in the book The Fifty Worst Films of All Time.

References

External links

 
 
 
 
 

1946 films
American black-and-white films
Films directed by Gordon Douglas
Film noir
Dick Tracy films
Films about organized crime in the United States
RKO Pictures films
1940s police procedural films
1940s crime films
American crime films
1940s American films